Daniel Selvaratnam Thiagarajah is a Sri Lankan Tamil bishop who is the fourth and current Bishop of Jaffna in the Church of South India.

Early life
Thiagarajah was educated at Jaffna Central College.

Career
Thiagarajah was consecrated as the fourth Church of South India Bishop of Jaffna on 21 August 2006. Some members of the diocese objected to the procedures used in Thiagarajah's appointment and took legal action. At point the diocesan council severed all links with the Church of South India.

References

 

Alumni of Jaffna Central College
Bishops of Jaffna (Church of South India)
Living people
People from Northern Province, Sri Lanka
Sri Lankan Tamil priests
Year of birth missing (living people)